Tiranimia is a genus of moth in the family Gelechiidae. It contains the species Tiranimia epidolella, which is found in Tunisia.

References

Gelechiinae